Quillota is a city located in the Aconcagua River valley in central Chile's Valparaíso Region. It is the capital and largest city of Quillota Province, where many inhabitants live in the outlying farming areas of San Isidro, La Palma, Pocochay, and San Pedro. It is an important agricultural center, mainly because of the plantations of avocado and cherimoya (custard apple) trees.

Quillota is connected to the city of La Calera by the small town of La Cruz. Charles Darwin described the area's agriculture and the landscape in his book The Voyage of the Beagle. In nearby La Campana National Park, there is a plaque at a viewpoint commemorating Darwin's visit.

History

The Quillota valley had been densely populated for about 2,000 years.  At the outset, the area was inhabited by Native Americans of the Bato and Lleo-Lleo cultures, who had migrated to the valley because of the fertile land south of the Aconcagua River.  These natives were later influenced by Mapuches and Diaguitas.  The Diaguitas are credited with the evolution of the local culture of the Aconcagua zone and were well known for their pottery.

Later, Quillota was mitma and the capital of Qullasuyu, the southern Inca Empire.

Diego de Almagro arrived in the valley in 1536.  Incan scouts directed him to a beautiful and very fertile valley where the "Quillotas" lived.  (Even before Almagro's arrival, a Spanish soldier from Peru called Don Gonzalo Calvo de Barrientos had been captured by the Quillotas and lived in the valley, learning the local language and culture during his captivity.)

Almagro was delighted with the valley, but as he was searching for gold and finding none he returned to Peru.  Almagro crossed the valley of Quillota and its environs. Having found the Aconcagua river overflowing and with few possibilities of finding gold, he deemed the land too difficult and returned to Peru, where he was executed.

Later, in 1540, Pedro de Valdivia arrived in Chile with the title of Governor of Chile. He arrived in the valley and built farms and houses, mainly for the slaves and the Indians who were working for him. Almost the whole area occupied by present-day Quillota was de Valdivia's property.

De Valdivia established here his fortress between San Pedro and Limache, extracting gold from La Campana mountain and cultivating the Rautén valley, La Palma and Boco, taking for himself all the area as his personal property, leaving the Mapocho valley as the capital when he founded Santiago.

After the conquest and during the Colonial period, the population was increasing with the mix of races (Spaniards and Aconcaguas) and culture.

In 1585, Quillota was declared the capital of the Corregimiento de Quillota, a large province between Illapel and Casablanca.

In the 16th century, attempts were made to found a village in the Quillota valley with all the features and requirements ordered by the Spanish Crown, but it did not succeed.

It was only on November 11, 1717, St. Martin's Day, that Quillota was founded as a city, originally named "Village of San Martin de la Concha of Quillota" in the valley bordering Mayaca Hill. The city was founded by the bishop, Luis Romero, and the governor, Don José de Santiago Concha y Salvatierra.

Demographics
According to data from the 2002 Census of Population and Housing, Quillota had 75,916 inhabitants (making it the 65th largest city in the country); of these, 66,025 (87.0%) lived in urban areas and 9,891 (13.0%) in rural areas. At that time, there were 37,191 men and 38,725 women.

A large part of Quillota's population are descendants of Spanish settlers and Mestizos. There are still a few families with lands in the valley given by the Spanish governors.

City planning
Quillota's motto is "Ciudad creada con cariño" meaning "City created with care". Quillota remains one of the most traditional cities in Chile in that its layout still mainly corresponds to the original colonial Spanish layout of seven blocks square.
Due to the geological composition of the ground and the frequency of earthquakes, its architecture has remained low-rise (with a four-story maximum) and traditional.

Given its fertile soil, its commune's economy is mainly agricultural, and it is one of the main production centers in the country.

Administration

As a commune, Quillota is a third-level administrative division of Chile administered by a municipal council, headed by an alcalde who is directly elected every four years. The 2008-2012 alcalde is Luis Alberto Mella Gajardo (DC). The municipal council has the following members:
 Mauricio Javier Ávila Pino (DC)
 María Genoveva Baeza Hermosilla (RN)
 Fernando Alberto Puentes Wasaff (DC)
 José Antonio Rebolar Rivas (RN)
 Víctor Manuel Vergara Flores (PR)
 Alejandro Eduardo Villarroel Castillo (UDI)

Within the electoral divisions of Chile, Quillota is represented in the Chamber of Deputies by Eduardo Cerda (PDC) and Andrea Molina (UDI) as part of the 10th electoral district, (together with La Ligua, Petorca, Cabildo, Papudo, Zapallar, Puchuncaví, Quintero, Nogales, Calera, La Cruz and Hijuelas). The commune is represented in the Senate by Ignacio Walker Prieto (PDC) and Lily Pérez San Martín (RN) as part of the 5th senatorial constituency (Valparaíso-Cordillera).

Schools and universities
The city is well endowed with educational facilities, for primary and secondary education. Given its agricultural importance in the country, many universities of the region have established their agricultural studies faculties here. The following is a list of some of these facilities:
       Colegio Valle del Aconcagua
 	Colegio Inglés Saint Gabriel
       Colegio Francisco de Miranda
 	Colegio Nuestra Señora del Huerto
 	Colegio San Ignacio de LaSalle
       Colegio Quillota Terranova
       Colegio Nueva Era Siglo XXI
       Colegio Niño Jesús de Praga
 	Colegio Técnico Diego Echeverría Castro, Marist Brothers
 	Instituto Rafael Ariztía, Marist Brothers
       Liceo Comercial de Quillota
 	Liceo de Hombres Santiago Escutti Orrego
 School of Agricultural Studies of the Universidad Católica de Valparaíso.

Tourism

Within the tourism sector many great tourist sites can be visited here such as:

 Quillota Square: For some, one of the most beautiful in the country, located in the heart of the Commune itself. A Parish found around San Martin de Tours, the Santo Domingo Convent, the Provincial Government, the Municipality of Quillota, etc. Completely renovated in late 2008, has a large cypress fallen in storms that hit the area in the 1980s, which was cut by the community, as a witness. Is also the Odeon, donated to the city by the Italian community. It's a place where you can see the valley tree species themselves, like palm trees in the center of the city, along with sculptures representing the four seasons.
 Municipal Park "Aconcagua": Located on La Conception street, almost to the river Aconcagua. Recreation center with playground, barbecue grills, vast green spaces, etc..
 "The Boco": a distant rural village a few kilometers from the city center. To access it you must cross the vehicular / pedestrian bridge at the end of Calle La Concepcion, coming to this small town. In it, you can find the "Quebrada del Pepper" which contains  "El Grillo" Ecotourism Center, the Quillota Airodrome, and the "Eden" Resort and Cabins, which has cabins and rooms for singles and doubles customers, with private pool, spa, gym, etc., and also a park open to the community, with a large pool and Restaurant. Nearby Boco is Rauten, with plenty of trees and a beautiful dam to spend a day with the family.
Historical and Archaeological Museum and Public Library Quillota Quillota Melvin Jones: The Historical-Archaeological Museum Quillota (MHAQ) was officially created on December 5, 1997, at the initiative of the Research and Dissemination Workshop of History and Geography Quillota to rescue the tradition Historical and Archaeological Heritage city. Currently works, along with the Public Library, in the Colonial House (MN), in San Martin Street # 336.
 'Camp San Isidro "General  Ricardo Izurieta Caffarena"': military compound, located in San Isidro, in Quillota, formerly the campus of the Cavalry School and today the garrison of the 1st Cavalry (Horse Guards) Regiment "Guard Horse Grenadiers" and the Army Equestrian Training School. It has a museum of vintage cars and carriages, and also a museum of tanks. Open on certain days, visitors can also enjoy the gardens and parks with ancient trees, as there are a large gum inside. It has beautiful structures, including the Chapel, built in 1892 and opened Quillota community in 1917, semi baroque style (indefinite), with sculptures and elements brought mainly from Cuzco (Ecuador), among other things.
 Botanical Garden "The Escalante": It is 1.8 km. of the City of "Boco". Created more than a decade ago, his specialty is Chilean cacti and other American countries, where the plants are found in the wild. There are over 1,000 species of cactus fields, plus a collection of orchids in Chilean habitat (15 species), and Chilean bulbs. There is also a sector of palms, native trees and shrubs, exotic trees, and a walking trail around the site, including a creek with running water and native plants.
 Rodeo School "The Huaso": Located in rural La Palma, this school is located in rodeo, in a beautiful environment in which native trees are highlighted, such as the Chilean Palm, araucaria pines, among others. It offers programs for adults and children for both men and ladies. Its purpose is to strengthen and grow our traditions promoveer huaso and mainly our national sports rodeo. It also has Criollos Games, activities related to the field, and museum visits.
 Huaso House and Museum: Located in the downtown area of the municipality, on White Street. It presents the history of huaso in Chile and the Central Zone. You can visit on weekdays.
 Bicentennial Stadium Lucio Fariña Fernández: sports stadium remodeled 2010. Is the Local soccer club headquarters, San Luis de Quillota. It has an estimated capacity of 7,500 spectators. Includes lighting on the roof structure, perimeter lighting, scoreboard, sound system, individual seats (seats), and a synthetic pitch of 105 x 68 meters as is provided for FIFA, able to be used 8 hours a day. Furthermore, it provides a stage for artistic events, with a dressing room, and newsroom management and includes two gyms, a medical exam room, and a first aid room for alternative sports such as martial arts. Include the possibility of an archaeological exhibition hall, which is expected to expose future remains of Aconcagua Cultural Complex, Bato, and Inca, who were rescued during the process of building the enclosure.
 Horseback "Old Pigeon"': Make riding by the natural landscapes of the city, through majestic landscapes and pristine. It also offers hayrides and leases them for weddings and / or events.
 Center "Sport Club Q"': Event Center and Sports Complex, located at 8 Whereabouts way to the cross, to the side of Route 60 CH. Football has tennis, tennis, pools, restaurants, Spa, Gym, sports schools, and function rooms.

Notable people
 Elmina Moisan (1897-1938), painter

References

External links
 Municipality of Quillota

Populated places in Quillota Province
Communes of Chile
Populated places established in 1717
Capitals of Chilean provinces
1717 establishments in the Spanish Empire